Ernesto Jason Liebrecht is an American voice actor who voices for a number of English versions of Japanese anime series and video games produced by Funimation/OkraTron 5000 and ADV Films. Some of his major roles include Lavi and the Millennium Earl in the D.Gray-man series, Tapion in Dragon Ball Z: Wrath of the Dragon, Syaoran in Tsubasa: Reservoir Chronicle and Cardcaptor Sakura: Clear Card, Rob Lucci in the Funimation dub of One Piece, Akira Takizawa in Eden of the East, Train Heartnet in Black Cat, Hei in Darker than Black, Larcade Dragneel in the final season of Fairy Tail, Dabi in My Hero Academia, Vulcan Joseph in Fire Force, Hiroto Suwa in Orange, Yato in Noragami, Mars in Black Clover, Zeke Yeager in Attack on Titan, and Shigeo Kageyama in the third season of Mob Psycho 100.

Biography
Liebrecht had a leading role in the indie film Home about which the Philadelphia City Paper said "The performances are uniformly strong, especially from winsome leads Liebrecht and Nicol Zanzarella," and for which he was nominated for best actor at the Trenton Film Festival. He also had a minor role (as Hey Now Kid) in David Byrne's film True Stories. He made a cameo as one of the "gang of four" in the indie film, Waking Life and is scheduled to play Jerry in the New York City premiere of Karla, a play by Steve Earle. He is a member of the Rude Mechs and was nominated for The Austin Critics' Table Awards "Outstanding Supporting Actor in a Comedy" for his performance in their production of Lipstick Traces.

Filmography

Anime

Animation

Film

Live-action

Video games

References

External links
 Official agency profile
 
 
 Jason Liebrecht at the Crystal Acids English Voice Actor & Production Staff Database
 

1973 births
Living people
American male film actors
American male stage actors
American male video game actors
American male voice actors
American people of Chilean descent
Hispanic and Latino American male actors
Male actors from Austin, Texas